Nabeel Abbas Lafta (born 1 January 1986 in Najaf, Iraq) is an Iraqi former footballer who last played as a defender for Naft Al-Wasat in the Iraqi Premier League.

Honours

Club 
Naft Al-Wasat
Iraqi Premier League: 2014–15

International 
AFC Asian Cup: 2007

External links 

1986 births
Living people
Iraqi footballers
Iraq international footballers
Iraqi expatriate footballers
People from Najaf
Expatriate footballers in Jordan
2007 AFC Asian Cup players
AFC Asian Cup-winning players
Najaf FC players
Association football defenders